Morgan Andrew Taylor (September 5, 1969 – August 11, 2022) was an American illustrator and songwriter. He was perhaps best known for his creation of the fictional character Gustafer Yellowgold, which earned two nominations for Grammy Awards in the category Best Children's Album.

Biography 
Taylor was born in Kettering, Ohio, the son of Elizabeth Young and Gordon Taylor. He attended Kettering High School. Taylor then attended college, but left without earning a degree. He moved to New York in 1999.

Taylor worked as a sound engineer. In 2004, he married Rachel Loshak; they have two children, Harvey and Ridley. In the same year, Taylor created the fictional character Gustafer Yellowgold. He had his own radio program on the AM radio station WKNY.

Taylor was nominated for two Grammy Awards in the category Best Children's Album. His first nomination was for the song "Dark Pie Concerns" at the 58th Annual Grammy Awards. His second nomination was for the song "Brighter Side" at the 60th Annual Grammy Awards.

Taylor died in August 2022 of sepsis at a hospital in Miamisburg, Ohio, at the age of 52.

References

External links 
Taylor's fictional character website

1969 births
2022 deaths
People from Kettering, Ohio
American male songwriters
American male singer-songwriters
Songwriters from Ohio
Singer-songwriters from Ohio
American illustrators
American radio hosts
Radio personalities from Ohio
Radio personalities from New York (state)
American audio engineers
20th-century American engineers
21st-century American engineers